Frank Cunimondo (born 1934) is an American jazz pianist and educator based in Pittsburgh, Pennsylvania. In addition to performing, Cunimondo has taught at Duquesne University and the University of Pittsburgh

References

External links
Frank Cunimondo Official Website 
pittsburghjazz.org

American jazz pianists
American male pianists
Musicians from Pittsburgh
Living people
American jazz educators
1934 births
20th-century American pianists
Jazz musicians from Pennsylvania
Educators from Pennsylvania
21st-century American pianists
20th-century American male musicians
21st-century American male musicians
American male jazz musicians